Kingswood Academy may refer to:

Kingswood Academy, Hull, East Riding of Yorkshire, England
Kingswood Secondary Academy, Corby, Northamptonshire, England

See also
Kingswood School (disambiguation)
Kingswood College (disambiguation)
Kingswood (disambiguation)